Francisco de Santa María Benavides Velasco, O.S.H. (died 1560) was a Roman Catholic prelate who served as Bishop of Segovia (1558–1560), Bishop of Mondoñedo (1550–1558), and Bishop of Cartagena (1541–1550).

Biography
Francisco de Santa María Benavides Velasco was ordained a priest in the Order of Saint Jerome.
On 20 July 1541, he was appointed during the papacy of Pope Paul III as Bishop of Cartagena.
On 2 August 1541, he was consecrated bishop. 
On 17 July 1550, he was appointed during the papacy of Pope Julius III as Bishop of Mondoñedo.
On 21 October 1558, he was appointed during the papacy of Pope Paul IV as Bishop of Segovia.
He served as Bishop of Segovia until his death on 15 May 1560.

References

External links and additional sources
 (for Chronology of Bishops) 
 (for Chronology of Bishops) 
 (for Chronology of Bishops) 
 (for Chronology of Bishops) 
 (for Chronology of Bishops) 
 (for Chronology of Bishops) 

16th-century Roman Catholic bishops in New Granada
Bishops appointed by Pope Paul III
Bishops appointed by Pope Julius III
Bishops appointed by Pope Paul IV
Roman Catholic bishops of Cartagena in Colombia
1560 deaths
Hieronymite bishops